The Turushka dynasty was an ancient royal dynasty that reigned in North India in the Kashmir, Kabulistan and Gandhara regions. The dynasty is speculated to either have been of mixed Western Turk-Hepthalite or Indo-Scythian origin. Though the inhabitants of the dynasty were mainly Hindu Brahmins, the ruling class of the dynasty were Buddhists and were strong believers of the Lord Buddha. Many Buddhist monuments were erected in Kashmir and Gandhara by this dynasty which showed their affection towards the Buddhist religion. It was common for Central Asian tribes who settled in India to adopt Buddhism and the Buddhist core beliefs in order to be integrated into Indian society. This dynasty is believed to have ruled Kashmir around the same time in which the Turk Shahi ruled Kabulistan and there may have been clashes between the two dynasties over the Kapisa and Gandhara regions. This dynasty was subjugated and conquered along with the whole of Kashmir by the Ghaznavids. Repeated waves of invasions led by the Ghaznavid Sultan Sabuktigin lead to the ultimate destruction of this dynasty and the eventual annexation of the Kashmir region. Thus, the Hindu-Buddhist Turushka power was destroyed and their lands fell to the Turkic Muslim Ghaznavid invaders who conquered both the Kashmir region and the Punjab region.

Bibliography
 Долин А. А., Попов Г. В. Кэмпо - традиция воинских искусств. Москва, Наука, 1991, 432 c., С.55-75. 
 Encyclopedic dictionary of Brockhaus and Efron: in 86 tons (82 tons and 4 extra). - SPb., 1890-1907.

References

Dynasties of India